The Kids We Used to Be... is the third full-length studio album by British hardcore punk band Your Demise. It is the first to feature new vocalist Ed McRae, following the departure of George Noble in 2009. The album was released on 20 September 2010 in the UK & Europe via Visible Noise.

Track listing

Personnel
Your Demise
 Ed McRae – vocals
 Stuart Paice – guitar
 Daniel Osborne – guitar
 James Sampson – bass
 James Tailby – drums

Guest appearances
 Mike Duce of Lower Than Atlantis – vocals on "Life of Luxury"
 Mike Hranica of The Devil Wears Prada – vocals on "Shine On"

References

2010 albums
Your Demise albums